"All the Songs" is a song by British singer Will Young. It was written by Young and Kish Mauve members Mima Stilwell and Jim Elliott for his seventh studio album Lexicon (2019), while production was helmed by Richard X. Released by Cooking Vinyl as the album's lead single on 22 March 2019, it reached number 24 on the UK Singles Downloads Chart.

Background
"All the Songs" was written by Young along with frequent collaborators, Kish Mauve members Mima Stilwell and Jim Elliott. Production on the track was helmed by Richard X with whom Young had previously worked on his fifth studio Echoes (2011). One ouf of only a few songs Young wrote for Lexicon, he compared "All the Songs" with his 2011 single "Jealousy," calling it one "of the best songs. I have ever written. In my life."

Critical reception
Attitude editor Will Stroude called the song "fantastic" and described it as "a melancholy slice of electo-pop heartbreak that recalls the understated brilliance of 2011's "Jealousy." The Times called "All the Song" a "classic Young — melodic and melancholic." In her review of parent album Lexicon, musicOMH critic Helen Clarke noted that the songs "starts with urgently delivered words almost spoken over a faltering piano before lunging into a bouncing, Robyn-esque banger. The lyrics bely a feel good, dance-floor friendly track [...] It's a bold start that lays out what Young wanted to do with this record; archive his struggles and announce his return to music with renewed enthusiasm."

Chart performance
"All the Songs" became Young's second consecutive lead single to miss the top 100 of the UK Singles Chart. It however debuted and peaked at number 24 on the UK Singles Downloads Chart in the week ending 4 April 2019.

Music video
A video for "All the Songs" was directed by Rankin and released on 22 March 2019. In the visuals, Young takes on an array of stripper personas, including a sailor, a biker, a cowboy and a businessman.

Credits and personnel
 Jim Eliot – writer
 Pete Hofmann – mixing
 Alex Maedows – bass guitar
 Jamie McCredie – guitar
 Mima Stilwell – writer
 Richard X – mixing, producer
 Will Young – vocals, writer

Charts

Release history

References

Will Young songs
2019 songs
2019 singles
Songs written by Will Young
Songs written by Jim Eliot
Songs written by Mima Stilwell